The 1981–82 Oregon State Beavers men's basketball team represented the Oregon State University as a member of the Pacific 10 Conference during the 1981–82 NCAA Division I men's basketball season. They were led by twelfth-year head coach Ralph Miller and played their home games on campus at Gill Coliseum in Corvallis, Oregon.

Oregon State finished the regular season at 23–4 (16–2 Pac-10), won a third consecutive conference title (by two games), and were ranked fourth in both polls. Despite dropping the regular season finale at Arizona State, they did not drop in the rankings, and were seeded second in the West region of the NCAA tournament.

The Beavers received an opening round bye, defeated Pepperdine in Pullman, and third-seeded Idaho in the Sweet Sixteen at Provo. In the regional final (Elite Eight), Oregon State lost 45–69 to eventual national runner-up Georgetown, and finished at 25–5.

Roster

Schedule and results

|-
!colspan=9 style=| Regular season

|-
!colspan=9 style=| NCAA Tournament

Rankings

Awards and honors
Lester Conner – Pac-10 Player of the Year

NBA Draft

References 

Oregon State Beavers men's basketball seasons
Oregon State
Oregon State
NCAA
NCAA